The WM Motor (Weltmeister) EX6 is a battery electric mid-size crossover SUV that is manufactured by the Chinese NEV manufacturer WM Motor (Chinese: 威马汽车) under the brand Weltmeister. The model was first revealed as the Weltmeister EX6 Limited pre-production model during the 2019 Shanghai Auto Show. The Weltmeister EX6 Limited is based on the EX6 concept car, and it is previewing the second model from Weltmeister Motor. The EX6 is available in 5-seater and 6-seater layouts.

Overview

The Weltmeister EX6 Plus production version made its debut at the 2019 Guangzhou Auto Show. It is available in 2 different variants with 2 different range of  respectively. Pricing ranges from 239,900 yuan to 289,900 yuan.

There are five variants of the EX6 Plus excluding the founders edition, the EX6 Plus 400 Arctic, EX6 Plus 500 Arctic, EX6 Plus Nex, EX6 Plus Pro, and the EX6 Plus 400 entry version. The EX6 Plus 400 Arctic and EX6 Plus 400 entry version are both equipped with a  battery that provides  NEDC range. The EX6 Plus 500 Arctic and the founders edition is equipped with a  battery and achieves  NEDC range.

WM Motor supplies a  6.6 kW, 220V home charger that can fully charge the EX6 in 9 to 11.5 hours. Charging from 30% to 80% takes 30 minutes when using 120 kW DC fast chargers.

References

External links

Mid-size sport utility vehicles
Crossover sport utility vehicles
Production electric cars
Cars introduced in 2019
Cars of China